Doña María Cristina Vilanova Castro de Árbenz (17 April 1915 – 5 January 2009) was the First Lady of Guatemala from 1951-1954, as wife of the Guatemalan President Jacobo Árbenz Guzmán.

Biography

Vilanova de Arbenz was born in San Salvador in 1915, where her parents belonged to the society elite.  She received a privileged education in elite European institutions. On a family trip to Guatemala she met the then-colonel Arbenz, and they eventually married there in 1937.

Vilanova was the first wife of a Guatemalan president to attend all of his public functions, and also the first one to perform socially active work. She has been often compared to Eva Perón given that she was also a feminist and had strong influence in the government during her husband's time in office. She was accused, along with her husband, of sympathies to Communism, and of exacting influence over him while in exile.

After her husband died in 1971 in Mexico, Vilanova moved to Costa Rica with her family, where she died in 2009.

Humiliation and exile 

After resigning due to the coup organized by the United Fruit Company and the United States Department of State, the Árbenz Vilanova family remained for 73 days at the Mexican embassy in Guatemala, which was crowded with almost 300 exiles.  When they were finally allowed to leave the country, Jacobo Arbenz was publicly humiliated at the airport when the liberationist authorities made the former president strip before the cameras, claiming that he was carrying jewelry he had bought for his wife at Tiffany's in New York City, using funds from the presidency. No jewelry was found during the hour-long interrogation. The Arbenz family then embarked into exile, taking them first to México, then to Canada, where they went to pick up daughter Arabella, and then on to Switzerland via the Netherlands. As a condition for entry, the Swiss authorities asked Arbenz to renounce his Guatemalan nationality, to prevent the ousted president from continuing his resistance in Switzerland. Arbenz refused this request, as he felt that such a gesture would mark the end of his political career. Furthermore, he could not benefit from political asylum, because Switzerland had not yet ratified the 1951 Agreement of the newly created United Nations High Commission for Refugees, designed to protect people fleeing from communist regimes in Eastern Europe. Árbenz and his family ended up instead the victims of an intense, CIA-orchestrated defamation campaign that lasted from 1954 to the triumph of the Cuban revolution in 1959. Árbenz's close friend Carlos Manuel Pellecer worked for the CIA, playing a key role in the defamation campaign.

After being spurned by Switzerland, the Árbenz family moved to Paris, and then to Prague. Czechoslovak officials were uncomfortable with his stay, unsure if he would demand compensation for the poor quality of Second World War-era arms that they had sold him in 1954. After only three months, he moved again, this time to Moscow, which proved to be a relief from the harsh treatment he received in Czechoslovakia. Arbenz tried several times to return to Latin America, and was finally allowed to move to Uruguay in 1957 (Arbenz joined the Communist Party in that year), living in Montevideo from 1957 to 1960. Uruguay had been supportive throughout the Guatemalan revolutionary process, and became home to the two former presidents of the so-called Guatemalan Democratic Spring.  Arbenz's predecessor, Juan José Arévalo, had been in Montevideo on several prior occasions, establishing himself there between 1958 and early 1959, when he accepted a university position in Venezuela; he expressed his views through a number of newspaper articles he penned.  On the other hand, Arbenz and his family, who arrived in mid-1957, had a very different experience: his communist ties, especially with José Manuel Fortuny, and forced passage through Czechoslovakia, the USSR and China, aroused suspicions.

When the National Party took power in Uruguay in late 1958, the situation worsened for Arbenz there. In 1960, after the Cuban Revolution, Fidel Castro invited Árbenz to Cuba, which Árbenz Guzmán readily agreed to.

Suicide of Arabella

In October 1965, Arabella Arbenz met Mexican bullfighter Jaime Bravo Arciga, who at that time was at his peak and was about to start a tour of South America; Arabella took advantage of this and fled with him to Colombia. While in Bogotá on 5 October 1965, Arabella tried to convince Bravo Arciga not to continue as a bullfighter, fearing for his life. After an afternoon where Bravo Arciga had been gored, he went to a luxurious gentlemen's club in the Colombian capital. Arabella phoned the place pleading to talk to Bravo Arciga, but he ignored her, as he was totally inebriated and in a foul mood after the goring. Dejected, she shot herself. 

Bravo Arciga contacted Jorge Palmieri in Mexico via telephone, and asked him to take charge of funeral arrangements. Palmieri, who had great influence in the Mexican government at the time, obtained approval to bury Arabella in the Pantheon of the National Association of Actors of Mexico, since she had worked in an experimental film a few months earlier. Palmieri also received concessions allowing Arbenz, his wife, and children to travel to Mexico for the funeral.

Arabella's death was a huge blow to both the bullfighter and Jacobo Arbenz: both would die within five years of her death.

Settlement with the Guatemalan Government 

In 2011, with a written agreement, the Guatemalan State recognized its international responsibility for "failing to comply with its obligation to guarantee, respect, and protect the human rights of the victims to a fair trial, to property, to equal protection before the law, and to judicial protection, which are protected in the American Convention on Human Rights and which were violated against former President Juan Jacobo Arbenz Guzman, his wife, María Cristina Vilanova, and his children, Juan Jacobo, María Leonora, and Arabella, all surnamed Arbenz Villanova."

See also

 Operation PBSuccess
 Arabella Arbenz
 Jacobo Árbenz Guzmán

Notes and references

References

Bibliography 

 
 
 
 
 
 
 
 
 
 
 
 
 
 
 
 

1915 births
2009 deaths
Leaders ousted by a coup
Guatemalan socialists
Guatemalan Revolution
Revolutionary Action Party politicians
First ladies of Guatemala
Guatemalan people of German descent
People from San Salvador
Árbenz family
Salvadoran emigrants to Guatemala
Notre Dame de Namur University alumni